Louis Dollot (1915–1997) was a French diplomat.

1915 births
1997 deaths
20th-century French non-fiction writers
20th-century French diplomats
20th-century French male writers